The 2014–15 Toto Cup Leumit was the 24th season of the second tier League Cup (as a separate competition) since its introduction. It was held in two stages. First, sixteen Liga Leumit teams were divided into four regionalized groups. The winners and runners-up advanced to the quarter-finals. Quarter-finals, semi-finals and the Final were held as one-legged matches. The final was played at the Ramat Gan Stadium on 9 December 2014, which saw Hapoel Bnei Lod defeat Bnei Yehuda with a score of 2–0.

The defending cup holders were Hapoel Rishon LeZion, having won the cup on its previous edition, but they were eliminated in the group stage.

Group stage
The draw took place on 30 June 2014.

The matches are due to be played from 2 August to 16 August 2014. However the opening date was postponed because of the 2014 Israel–Gaza conflict. and the group stage matches were played between 12 August and 19 August 2014. The first round of group stage matches was played on 12 August 2014, and the second the following Friday, 15 August 2014.

Tiebreakers
If two or more teams are equal on points on completion of the group matches, the following criteria are applied to determine the rankings.
 Superior goal difference
 Higher number of victories achieved
 Higher number of goals scored
 Higher number of points obtained in the group matches played among the teams in question
 Superior goal difference from the group matches played among the teams in question
 Higher number of victories achieved in the group matches played among the teams in question
 Higher number of goals scored in the group matches played among the teams in question
 A deciding match, if needed to set which team qualifies to the quarter-finals.

Group A

Group B

Group C

Group D

Knockout rounds

Quarterfinals

Semifinals

Final

See also
 2014–15 Toto Cup Al
 2014–15 Liga Leumit
 2014–15 Israel State Cup

References

External links
 Official website 

Leumit
Toto Cup Leumit
Toto Cup Leumit